Sylvie Prenveille (born 2 September 1958 in Paris) is a former French athlete, who specialized in the high jump.

Biography  
She won four championship titles of France in the high jump: one Outdoors in 1980 and three Indoors from 1977 to 1979.

Her personal bests are 1.85 m outdoors (1984), and 1.90  Indoors  (1983).

Prize list  
 French Athletics Championships:
 winner of the high jump in 1980
 French Indoor Athletics Championships:
 winner of the high jump in 1977,  1978 and 1979

Records

Notes and references
 Docathlé2003, Fédération française d'athlétisme, 2003, p. 427

1958 births
Living people
French female high jumpers
Athletes from Paris